Charles Francis Dowell (27 January 1888 - 10 December 1972 ) was an Australian rules footballer for  in the Victorian Football League (VFL).

He played his final VFL match in 1912 having played 8 matches.

References

External links
 
 

1888 births
1972 deaths
Fitzroy Football Club players
Australian rules footballers from Victoria (Australia)